James Thacker Milliken (August 20, 1882 – October 12, 1952) was an American politician and businessman.

Life 
Milliken was born in Traverse City, Michigan. He graduated from Traverse City High School in 1902. Milliken also graduated from Olivet College in 1906 and from Yale University in 1908.

Milliken worked for his family business, the J.W. Milliken Inc., Department Store in Traverse City. Milliken was also became involved in the Acemeline Manufacturing Company. Milliken then went on to serve as mayor of Traverse City from 1922 to 1928 as a Republican. He also served on the Traverse City Board of Education and was president of the board of education. Milliken served in the Michigan Senate from 1941 to 1950. His father James W. Milliken and his son William Milliken also served in the Michigan Senate. Milliken died from a heart attack at his home in Traverse City, Michigan.

References

External links 

1882 births
1952 deaths
Burials in Michigan
People from Traverse City, Michigan
Olivet College alumni
Yale University alumni
Businesspeople from Michigan
School board members in Michigan
Mayors of Traverse City, Michigan
Mayors of places in Michigan
Republican Party Michigan state senators
20th-century American politicians
20th-century American businesspeople